Franklin Andrew "Frankie" Rodriguez is an American actor. He stars as Carlos Rodriguez on the Disney+ series High School Musical: The Musical: The Series. He has appeared in every season of the show.

Early life
Rodriguez is from Selma, California and is of Mexican descent. Rodriguez is the youngest of three siblings. Rodriguez attended grade schools in Selma and later transferred to a private school earning his high school diploma in Sanger, California. He then graduated from Sanger High School.

Personal life
Rodriguez is part of the LGBTQ community. Since late 2019, Rodriguez has been in a relationship with fellow High School Musical: The Musical: The Series actor Joe Serafini, who plays his character Carlos' love interest Seb (Sebastian) on the show.

Career
Rodriguez played the role of Mick in the Dekkoo series I'm Fine. He was promoted to series regular for the third and final season. He has had recurring and guest roles in the television series Modern Family and This Close as well as in the web series Raymond & Lane, That's the Gag, Only Children, and Going Up.

In February 2019, it was announced Rodriguez would star in the Disney+ series High School Musical: The Musical: The Series as Carlos Rodriguez, the color guard captain and student choreographer. The series premiered that November. Carlos is the first openly gay character in the High School Musical franchise.

Filmography

References

External links
 

Living people
American male actors of Mexican descent
American male television actors
American male web series actors
American gay actors
Hispanic and Latino American male actors
LGBT Hispanic and Latino American people
LGBT people from California
Male actors from California
People from Sanger, California
Year of birth missing (living people)